
 

Mount Jagged is a locality in the Australian state of South Australia located about  south of the state capital of Adelaide and about  north-west and  north respectively of the municipal seats of Goolwa and Victor Harbor.

The boundaries were created in August 1998 for the part in the District Council of Victor Harbor and then again in August 2000 for the part in the Alexandrina Council.  Its name is derived from Mount Jagged, a hill located within its boundaries.

The Victor Harbor Road passes through the locality.  Land use within Mount Jagged is limited to non-broadacre farming and horticulture due to its location within a zone for the protection of groundwater intended to supply the needs of the town of Mount Compass.

Mount Jagged is located within the federal division of Mayo, the state electoral district of Finniss and the local government areas of the Alexandrina Council and the City of Victor Harbor.

References

Towns in South Australia